Steven Jerel Rogers (born August 26, 1953) is a former American football player who played professionally as a running back in the National Football League (NFL). He played in the NFL for two seasons, one each with the New Orleans Saints and New York Jets. He had 62 yards rushing on 17 attempts in his pro career, all coming with the Saints.

Rogers was born in Jonesboro, Louisiana and attended Ruston High School. He attended college at Louisiana State University, where he played college football for the LSU Tigers football team. He rushed for 1,279 yards on 287 carries in his career at LSU and scored three touchdowns. He scored the Tigers' only touchdown in the team's 16–9 loss to Penn State in the 1974 Orange Bowl.

References

1953 births
Living people
American football running backs
LSU Tigers football players
New Orleans Saints players
New York Jets players
Ruston High School alumni
People from Jonesboro, Louisiana
Players of American football from Louisiana